This is a chronological list of military conflicts in which Polish armed forces fought or took place on Polish territory from the reign of Mieszko I (960–992) to the ongoing military operations.

This list does not include peacekeeping operations (such as UNPROFOR, UNTAES or UNMOP), humanitarian missions or training missions supported by the Polish Armed Forces.

The list gives the name, the date, the Polish allies and enemies, and the result of these conflicts following this legend:



Piast Poland 

During the Middle Ages, Poland sought to incorporate other fellow West Slavic peoples under the rule of the Polan dukes, such as Mieszko I, Boleslaw I Chrobry and their descendants, and then defend the lands acquired in the west from the Holy Roman Empire. In the east and south it struggled with Ruthenia, Bohemia and Tatar raiders. In the north-east, it encountered intermittent Lithuanian and Prussian raids.

Jagiellon Poland 

For much of its early history as a Christian state, Poland had to contend with Pomeranians, Prussians, Lithuanians and other Baltic peoples in continuous border wars without clear results or end in sight.  After the Teutonic Order conquered and assimilated the Prussians, it began incursions into both Polish and Lithuanian territories. This represented a far greater threat to both Poland and Lithuania, and the two countries united in a defensive alliance by the crowning of the Lithuanian Duke Jogaila as King of Poland (as Władysław II) which led to a major confrontation at the Battle of Grunwald in 1410 and subsequent wars until 1525, when the Order became a vassal to the Polish Crown.

Polish–Lithuanian Commonwealth 

The 17th century saw fierce rivalry between the then major Eastern European powers – Sweden, the Polish–Lithuanian Commonwealth and the Ottoman Empire. At its heyday, the Commonwealth comprised the territories of present-day Poland, and large parts of Ukraine, Belarus, Lithuania, Latvia, Estonia, and Russia, and represented a major European power. However, by the end of the 18th century a series of internal conflicts and wars with foreign enemies led to the dissolution of the Polish–Lithuanian Commonwealth and the partitioning of most of its dependent territories among other European powers.

During the 18th century, European powers (most frequently consisting of Russia, Sweden, Prussia and Saxony) fought several wars for the control of the territories of the former Polish–Lithuanian Commonwealth.  At the end of the 18th century, some Poles attempted to defend Poland from growing foreign influence in the country's internal affairs.  These late attempts to preserve independence eventually failed, ultimately ending in Poland's partition and the final dissolution of the remains of the Polish–Lithuanian Commonwealth.

19th century and World War I

Poles unsuccessfully struggled to win back their independence throughout the 19th century. At first, they put their hopes in Napoleon. Later, they tried to ignite national uprisings every now and then – most of them bloodily repressed.

Modern history 

In the turmoil of the First World War, Poles managed to regain independence and then to expand their territory in a series of local wars and uprisings; only to be occupied again during the next world war.  The second half of the 20th century was more peaceful, but still tense, as Poland was involved in the Cold War on the Soviet side. Later, at the beginning of the 21st century Poland is involved in the War against terrorism on the NATO side.

See also

 
 
 
 
 
 
 Category:Lists of wars

Notes

Footnotes

References 
 
 
 
 
 
 
 Winged Hussars, Radoslaw Sikora, Bartosz Musialowicz, BUM Magazine, 2016.

Further reading

   Return to top of page.

Poland
 

Wars
Wars
Wars of independence